Cartí Airport  is an airport serving the Cartí islands in the San Blas Archipelago of Panama.

Airlines and destinations

See also

Transport in Panama
List of airports in Panama

References

External links
 OurAirports - Panama
 OpenStreetMap - Cartí
 Panoramio - Cartí Airport

 Google Earth

Airports in Panama
Guna Yala